= Etienne Burdet =

British academic

Etienne Burdet is professor of human robotics at Imperial College London. He is known for presenting experimental evidence that the central nervous system controls unstable dynamics by learning optimal impedance e.g. magnitude and direction of body stiffness (and mechanical impedance) are changed via learning to cope with dynamically unstable tasks.
